Ted Milian (born February 18, 1954) is a former Canadian football center who played six seasons in the Canadian Football League with the Edmonton Eskimos and Calgary Stampeders. He was a territorial exemption of the Edmonton Eskimos in the 1976 CFL Draft. He played CIS football college football at the University of Manitoba.

References

External links
 
 Just Sports Stats

Living people
1954 births
Players of Canadian football from Manitoba
Canadian football centres
Canadian football offensive linemen
Manitoba Bisons football players
Edmonton Elks players
Calgary Stampeders players